Mauricio Eduardo Cataldo Mancilla (born 28 February 1979) is a Chilean former footballer.

Club career
He is well remembered for his rabona golden goal to then Universidad de Chile's goalkeeper Johnny Herrera during the Chilean 2003 Torneo Apertura. That goal occurred in the extra Time of a playoff's quarterfinals match to the define the tournament's champion.

After football

Politics
In 2016, he decided to run for councilor, reason why he sought support at political party Patriotic Union, an instrumental left–wing party (self-proclaimed "progressivist") from marxist–leninist organization Communist Party of Chile–Proletarian Action. He unsuccessfully competed in the elections in La Florida, Santiago's commune, where he failed to reach a municipal post. In 2019, again he announced his intention to compete for the municipal elections in La Florida.

Personal life
He has repeatedly said he had problems with alcohol and that he frequented getting drunk before training.

Honours

Club
Cobreloa
 Primera División de Chile (1): 2004 Clausura

Unión Española
 Primera División de Chile (1): 2005 Apertura

References

External links
 

1979 births
Living people
Footballers from Santiago
Chilean footballers
Audax Italiano footballers
Provincial Osorno footballers
Universidad de Concepción footballers
Cobreloa footballers
Unión Española footballers
Unión San Felipe footballers
Santiago Morning footballers
Lota Schwager footballers
Ñublense footballers
C.D. Arturo Fernández Vial footballers
Chilean Primera División players
Primera B de Chile players
Tercera División de Chile players
Association football forwards
Patriotic Union (Chile) politicians
Chilean politicians
Politicians from Santiago
Chilean sportsperson-politicians
Hoxhaists